The following page is a list of highway rest areas in North Korea. On highways in North Korea, they are indicated by a "주" road sign that stands for 주차장 (Parking).

List of highway rest areas

Major highway rest areas

Unproven rest areas 
Due to the term "teahouse" sometimes being synonymous with a roadside rest area, there are a few other places that have teahouses that are possibly also rest stops. In most other cases, teahouses are not necessarily rest areas.

Other roadside facilities 
The Arch of Reunification south of Pyongyang resembles a highway rest area.
Some locations are simply roadside turnouts: unmanned, generally dirt clearings along the side of a road for maneuvering and safety purposes.
A few kilometers outside Pyongyang, when entering the city there is a highway checkpoint on the Pyongyang–Kaesong Motorway, the Pyongyang–Wonsan Tourist Motorway, the Pyongyang–Huichon Motorway, and the Youth Hero Motorway. There are likely other examples.
There is also a checkpoint across the river from Kumchon along the Pyongyang–Kaesong Motorway on the way to the DMZ.
There is a checkpoint between the Kaesong Industrial Complex and South Korea, both on the north korean and south korean sides.

See also 
Motorways in North Korea
Rest area

References 

Roads in North Korea
Rest areas
Highway rest area
Lists of buildings and structures in North Korea